Stuart Havel Rowe (8 May 1928 – 30 March 2019) was an Australian rules football player who played for the Richmond Football Club in the VFL from 1948 to 1957.

Biography 
Rowe played school football at Geelong College before moving to Melbourne, where he played with amateur club Ormond before joining the Tigers.

He won Richmond's Best and Fairest award in 1953, and received life membership of the club immediately after retiring at the end of the 1957 season. In 2015 he was inducted into the Richmond Hall of Fame.

References

Sources
 Hogan P: The Tigers Of Old, Richmond FC, Melbourne 1996
 Vale Havel Rowe

External links
 
 
 Tigerland Archive profile

1928 births
2019 deaths
Richmond Football Club players
Jack Dyer Medal winners
Ormond Amateur Football Club players
Australian rules footballers from Victoria (Australia)
People educated at Geelong College